The Westcott Theater is a 700-person multi-purpose, cinema-style concert venue at 524 Westcott St in the Westcott neighborhood of Syracuse, New York, United States.  Although it books acts of many different genres, the venue has been steadily increasing its amount of electronic music acts since 2011. Formerly known as the Westcott Cinema, it was re-purposed and re-opened in Oct. 18, 2007 to serve as a local concert venue for the Westcott Nation as well as attract much of the Syracuse University and the State University of New York College of Environmental Science and Forestry concert going college crowd.

History 
The building that is now known as the Westcott Theater was first constructed in 1919.  Formerly called the Harvard Theater and then the Studio, the theater originally acted as a cinema hosting a variety of films ranging from vaudeville films to more risque adult films.  In 1993 Nat Tobin, local film enthusiast and manager of the Manlius Art Cinema, took control of the cinema's lease and re-opened the property now calling it the Westcott Cinema.  Under Tobin the single-screen cinema screened contemporary films for 14 years before having to close down in October 2007.  Interested in appropriating the now defunct cinema, local entrepreneurs Sam Levey and Dan Mastronardi approached building owner Ray Duplain with an offer.  After renovating the former cinema, tearing out the old seats and screen and installing a small bar, the Westcott Theater opened for business.  The venue began hosting shows in September 2008, although its official opening was not held until November of the same year.  The Post Standard's Chris Baker said in 2013 that “the [Westcott] theater has become the most consistent midsize venue in [Syracuse] with about 120 shows annually.”

Concerts 
In Syracuse the Westcott Theater performed two concerts by moe. Dated 31 July 2020 and 1 August 2020, as Vernon Downs unexpectedly cancelled the drive-in activities of the jam rock team.

References

Theatres in New York (state)
Theatres completed in 1919
Music venues completed in 2008
Buildings and structures in Syracuse, New York